is a tram station on the Tokyo Sakura Tram in Toshima, Tokyo, Japan, operated by Tokyo Metropolitan Bureau of Transportation (Toei). It is 8.4 kilometres from the starting point of the Tokyo Sakura Tram at Minowabashi Station.

Layout
Sugamoshinden Station has two opposed side platforms.

Surrounding area
 Tokyo Metropolitan Bunkyo High School

History
The station opened on August 20, 1911.

Railway stations in Japan opened in 1911